Bałtów  is a village in the administrative district of Gmina Żyrzyn, within Puławy County, Lublin Voivodeship, in eastern Poland.

References

External links
View on Wikimapia

Villages in Puławy County